Ted Mason (London, England), better known by his stage name T. Mason, is a British Nicaraguan musician and producer. He was a former member, manager and producer of the British band Modern English. He is currently a member of the British American duo McGovern & Mason, with Elizabeth McGovern.

Biography
Ted Mason is a former member of the multiplatinum British rock/pop band Modern English, former journalist for the British newspaper the Guardian UK and an EMMY nominated film producer. The band has sold over 8 million records in the United States with hit songs such as Melt with you, Hands Across the Sea, Ricochet Days, 16 Days, After the Snow, and I Can't Breath. He is a producer, composer (composing and producing the music for the Academy Award- winning HBO doc “Prudence’s Song”) as well as a lead guitarist, Classical/Flamenco/Bebop guitarist, singer, songwriter and he is President of his own Record Label Mi5 Recordings, financed distributed by Universal Music Group. As a producer, Mason has worked some of the most successful artists in music and in every genre from Rock, Soul, Hip Hop, Classical, World Music to Rai Music.

Mason has worked with various musicians as a musician, producer, and label rep: AKON, Chris Brown, Mary J Blige, Jeff Beck, Robert Plant, Santana, Pharrell Williams, Ne-Yo, Snoop Dogg, Cheb Khaled, Rachid Taha, Gang Starr, Dead Prez, Midge Ure, Bob Geldof, the Verve, Jesus and the Mary Chain, Prince, Papa Wemba, DJ Khaled, Youssou N’dour, Sandra Bernhard, Real Roxanne, Macy Grey, Thomas Mapfumo, and Peter Gabriel, Common, Too Short, Ringo Starr, Timmy Allen, Wyclef Jean, Jesus Jones, Mercan Dede, Salif Keita, Infamous Mobb, Wu-Tang, Ali Campbell (UB40), Shaggy, Prodigy (Mobb Deep), The Prodigy (Mi5 UK), Donna Summer, Keith Diamond, Billy Ocean, Diblo Dibala, Lokua Kansa, Mathematics, Fishbone, Defari, Lucky Diop, Gang Starr, Betty Carter, Joe Pass, Herb Ellis, Juan Carmona, and Paco de Lucia.

Mason handles all aspects in the music industry in regards to the label Mi5 Recordings which include, financial projections for releases, management, Artists Development, Radio program financials and implementation for releases both for Mi5 Recordings and Universal Music Group, royalty management, legal management, contractual development and implementation, production and artist's composition. In film Production, Mason handles financial projection and budgets, artist procurement, live production (which include live Times Square productions of Volvo for Life Awards, with responsibilities of full music production and artist procurement, full backline and video production, lighting production, legal artist contractual agreements for Volvo Cars North America, Mercedes Benz North America, Ford Motor Company North America and Times Square Productions.

Mason has worked as a composer and film producer on many films including the HBO Academy Award-winning documentary film project "Music By Prudence," directed Roger Ross Williams. Mason was also nominated Emmy Nominated Music/film producer for the same film. He has worked Miloš Forman and other directors. He also works closely with his wife Jennifer Brunetti, (former company owner of Fbi Productions, Inc.) with Umbrella Media LLC, a film company Mason has financed and includes corporate film production, documentaries and all aspects of film production. website: www.thisisumbrella.com

Discography

Partial listing of productions and Mi5 Recordings Universal Music Group releases https://www.reverbnation.com/Mi5recordings
Partner label releases High Times Records http://www.allmusic.com/artist/high-times-records-mn0000319444

Productions, Mi5 Releases, Ted Mason Executive Producer productions etc. Robert Plant and Jeff Beck - Look Out Mabel

https://www.reverbnation.com/Mi5recordings/song/27770997-robert-plant-and-jeff-beck-big
Pharrell Williams, Common, Ted Mason, Big Mo Biz - This is Hip Hop Baby (Rock Release)

https://www.reverbnation.com/tedmason/song/20909900-this-is-hip-hop-baby-ft-common
Ne-Yo - Take Your Time

https://www.reverbnation.com/Mi5recordings/song/23081219-take-your-time-ne-yo-and-dk
Snoop Dogg and Pharrell Williams - Watch Your Girl

https://www.reverbnation.com/Mi5recordings/song/23081190-watch-your-girl-pharrell-williams
Common and Pharrell Williams - This is Hip Hop Baby (Urban Release)

https://www.reverbnation.com/tedmason/song/20909900-this-is-hip-hop-baby-ft-common
Mary J Blige - Wake Up

https://www.reverbnation.com/Mi5recordings/song/23081205-wake-up-mary-j-blige
Carlos Santana, Cheb Khaled - Love the People

https://www.reverbnation.com/Mi5recordings/song/27770338-cheb-khaled-ft-carlos-santana-love
UB 40, Ali Campbell and Shaggy

https://www.reverbnation.com/Mi5recordings/song/23081576-shes-lady-ali-campbell-ub-40-and
Ted Mason - Deep In Your Jungle - 16 weeks #2 National Charts top 40 DRT

https://www.reverbnation.com/Mi5recordings/song/23081498-deep-in-your-jungle-ted-mason-from
Kenny Lattimore, Lamont Fleming - I Can See The World

https://www.reverbnation.com/Mi5recordings/song/23081446-i-can-see-world-kenny-lattimore
Modern English: Modern English - I Don't Know Anything

https://www.reverbnation.com/modernenglishmi5/song/22393234-i-dont-know-anything-original-rarities
Modern English - Heaven

https://www.reverbnation.com/Mi5recordings/song/23081286-heaven-modern-english
Modern English - I Can't Breath

https://www.reverbnation.com/Mi5recordings/song/23081339-i-cant-breath-modern-english
Modern English - Killing Screens

https://www.reverbnation.com/Mi5recordings/song/23081365-killing-screens-modern-english
Modern English - Film One

https://www.reverbnation.com/Mi5recordings/song/23081379-film-one-modern-english
Modern English - Hold On

https://www.reverbnation.com/Mi5recordings/song/23081354-hold-on-modern-english
Metal, Rock and Alternative Rock Helldorado - Fade Away

https://www.reverbnation.com/Mi5recordings/song/27781978-fade-away-helldorado
Helldorado - Loves Like a Hurricane 16 weeks top 40 National DRT Charts

https://www.reverbnation.com/Mi5recordings/song/27782016-loves-like-hurrican-helldorado
Helldorado - Brass Knuckle - Priest

https://www.reverbnation.com/helldoradous/song/20417477-brass-knuckle-priest
Axis Five - Freedom

https://www.reverbnation.com/Mi5recordings/song/27781846-freedom-axis-five
Axis Five - Memory Maker

https://www.reverbnation.com/Mi5recordings/song/27781851-memory-maker-axis-five
Axis Five - Break In Two

https://www.reverbnation.com/axisfive/song/25971323-break-in-two
Axis Five - The Other Side

https://www.reverbnation.com/axisfive/song/25971358-the-other-side
Ted Mason - My Life - from the album The Road To Mecca - 16 weeks National DRT top 40

https://www.reverbnation.com/Mi5recordings/song/23081529-my-life-ted-mason-from-modern-english
Baby Bam and G - Magic Sand

https://www.reverbnation.com/Mi5recordings/song/23081389-magic-sand-baby-bam-and-g-jungle
Modern English - Elastic

https://www.reverbnation.com/modernenglishmi5/song/22394191-elastic
Modern English - When I Cum

https://www.reverbnation.com/modernenglishmi5/song/22394148-waves-when-i-cum
John Ashton Psychedelic Furs -

https://www.reverbnation.com/Mi5recordings/song/26278115-john-ashton-and-satellite-paradiso
John Ashton Psychedelic Furs -

https://www.reverbnation.com/satelliteparadiso/song/26011118-dream
John Ashton Psychedelic Furs -

https://www.reverbnation.com/satelliteparadiso/song/26015555-super-anti-hero
John Ashton Psychedelic Furs

https://www.reverbnation.com/satelliteparadiso/song/26025602-big-block
Ted Mason - The Road to Mecca - from the album The Road To Mecca - 16 weeks National DRT top 40

https://www.reverbnation.com/Mi5recordings/song/23081506-road-to-mecca-ted-mason-modern
MercySide - If You Knew Her

https://www.reverbnation.com/Mi5recordings/song/23081646-if-you-knew-her-mercyside
Ted Mason - How Could You Know - 16 weeks National DRT top 40

https://www.reverbnation.com/tedmason/song/20007894-how-could-you-know
Ted Mason - Now You Tell Me from the album The Road To Mecca - 16 weeks National DRT top 40

https://www.reverbnation.com/tedmason/song/20288314-now-you-tell-me
Hip Hop and Urban R&B Snoop Dogg & Kinfolk - Don't Go To Work

https://www.reverbnation.com/Mi5recordings/song/23081253-dont-go-to-work-snoop-dogg-and
Snoop Dogg and Kinfolk - Happy I Met You

https://www.reverbnation.com/Mi5recordings/song/23081247-happy-i-met-you-snoop-dogg-and
Wu-Tang Harlem 6 - Pure Fire

https://www.reverbnation.com/Mi5recordings/song/27705794-pure-fire-harlem-6-wu-tang-mi5universal
Lamont Fleming, Timmy Allen - Do

https://www.reverbnation.com/Mi5recordings/song/23081458-do-lamont-fleming-timmy-allen-producer
Kenny Lattimore - I Can See the World

https://www.reverbnation.com/Mi5recordings/song/23081446-i-can-see-world-kenny-lattimore
Baby Bam and G Jungle Brothers - Skirt Off

https://www.reverbnation.com/Mi5recordings/song/23081398-skirt-off-baby-bam-and-g-jungle
Baby Bam and G Jungle Brothers - Magic Sand

https://www.reverbnation.com/Mi5recordings/song/23081389-magic-sand-baby-bam-and-g-jungle
Alternative, Avant Garde MercySide - Roses in the Field

https://www.reverbnation.com/Mi5recordings/song/23081626-roses-in-the-field-mercyside
MercySide - Truth is

https://www.reverbnation.com/Mi5recordings/song/23081616-truth-is-mercyside
Mercyside - Prisoner

https://www.reverbnation.com/Mi5recordings/song/23081621-prisoner-mercyside
African Soukous Diablo Dibala - Papa Wemba Shaima

https://www.reverbnation.com/Mi5recordings/song/23081580-shama-diblo-dibala-papa-wemba
Country Clarke and Cable - As Time Goes On

https://www.reverbnation.com/Mi5recordings/song/23490493-as-time-goes-on-clarke-and-cable
Clarke and Cable - It Takes Two

https://www.reverbnation.com/clarkeandcable/song/22870475-it-takes-two
Clarke and Cable - Free Wheelin

https://www.reverbnation.com/clarkeandcable/song/22870451-free-wheelin
Justin Fabus - Kiss of a Gypsy

https://www.reverbnation.com/justinfabusband/song/25346652-kiss-of-a-gypsy
Justin Fabus - Just Drive

https://www.reverbnation.com/justinfabusband/song/24247389-just-drive
Justin Fabus - Love ya like a Country Song

https://www.reverbnation.com/justinfabusband/song/26864362-love-ya-like-a-country-song
https://www.reverbnation.com/BrielleTheArtist
https://www.reverbnation.com/control_room/artist/4755092/my_videos
Guitar, Classical Ted Mason - Deux Arabesque II - 11 string alto guitar

https://www.reverbnation.com/Mi5recordings/song/23081550-duex-arabesque-ii-ted-mason-from
Ted Mason - Deux Arabesque I - 11 string alto guitar

https://www.reverbnation.com/Mi5recordings/song/23081543-deux-arabesque-ted-mason-from-modern

Producing

Mason has worked as a producer/musician and executive produce with numerous artists including releases with Snoop Dogg, Common, Ice Cube, Jeff Beck, Robert Plant, Cheb Khaled, Ne-Yo, Mary J Blige, and  Pharrell Williams. In 2010 he toured in Central Africa backed by Rwanda's Soukous All Stars and a duet with Lokua Kanza while producing the Fes Pad concert series for the country of Rwanda. He was involved in producing a solo album, an album with Mobb Deep and a duet with Wyclef Jean and Mona Lisa.

Film production
Mason worked as a composer and film producer on many films including the HBO Academy Award-winning documentary film project "Music By Prudence," directed by Roger Ross Williams. He is an EMMY nominated music producer. He is currently involved in producing numerous music videos for his artists as well as full length independent film productions.  Past directors included Miloš Forman and Academy Award Film director Roger Ross Williams. He also works closely with his wife Jennifer Brunetti, (former company owner of FBI Productions, Inc.) in producing video, film and live concert events most notably "Volvo for Life Awards" which included production logistics and booking of acts such as Sheryl Crow, Ziggy Marley, and Suzanne Vega.  Currently he is working on his new album and working closely as a partner with musician, producer, songwriter extraordinaire Jerry Wonder and Wonda Music.

Background
Mason grew up in both UK and San Francisco to a mixed parentage. Father was from Sheffield, Mother from Nicaragua.

References

External links
 

British rock musicians
Living people
British people of Nicaraguan descent
Year of birth missing (living people)